"Love Life" is a Pet Shop Boys song originally performed and released by the Swedish band Alcazar. It was the fourth single to be taken from their #2 album Alcazarized. The song was originally titled "Can I Be the One?", and was demoed by Pet Shop Boys themselves.  "Love Life" peaked at #10 in Sweden.

Alcazar version

Formats and track listings
These are the formats and track listings of promotional single releases of "Love Life".

CD single
"Original Version" - 3:54
"Extended Version" - 6:35
"FL Rebirth Club Mix" - 9:22

Chart performance

Pet Shop Boys version

Pet Shop Boys released their own version of "Love Life" as a limited edition 7" single for Record Store Day in April 2010.

limited edition 7-inch single 
A. "Love life"

B. "A Powerful Friend"

References

Alcazar (band) songs
2003 singles
RCA Records singles
Songs written by Neil Tennant
Songs written by Chris Lowe
2003 songs